Martin Pospíšil (born 26 June 1991) is a Czech professional footballer who plays as a midfielder for Czech First League club Sigma Olomouc. After playing for the under-21 national team, Pospíšil made his debut for the Czech Republic national team against Slovakia on 14 November 2012.

Career
On 4 July 2017, he joined Ekstraklasa club Jagiellonia Białystok on a four-year contract for a fee of €325,000.

Career statistics

Club

Honours 
Sigma Olomouc
 Czech Cup: 2011–12
 Czech Supercup: 2012

References

External links 

 
 SK Sigma Olomouc profile
 

1991 births
Living people
People from Olomouc District
Sportspeople from the Olomouc Region
Association football midfielders
Czech footballers
Czech Republic youth international footballers
Czech Republic under-21 international footballers
Czech Republic international footballers
Czech National Football League players
Czech First League players
Ekstraklasa players
SK Sigma Olomouc players
FK Fotbal Třinec players
FC Viktoria Plzeň players
FK Jablonec players
Jagiellonia Białystok players
Czech expatriate footballers
Expatriate footballers in Poland
Czech expatriate sportspeople in Poland